Thomas Theodore Crittenden (January 1, 1832 – May 29, 1909) was a United States colonel during the American Civil War, and a Democratic politician who served as the 24th Governor of Missouri from 1881 to 1885.

Early life and education
Crittenden was born in 1832 in Shelbyville, Kentucky to Henry and Anna Maria Crittenden. He was born into a political family and was the nephew of Kentucky Governor John J. Crittenden. He was educated at Centre College and also studied law with his uncle.

Marriage and family
In 1856, Crittenden married Caroline Wheeler "Carrie" Jackson (August 1, 1839 – January 27, 1917) and had several children. His son Thomas T. Crittenden, Jr. was later a mayor of Kansas City, and his son Henry Huston Crittenden (1859–1943) was compiler of The Crittenden Memoirs (1936).

Career
Shortly following Crittenden's marriage, the family moved to Lexington, Missouri, where he started a law practice. During the American Civil War Crittenden was appointed a Colonel in the 7th Missouri State Militia Cavalry, fighting on the Union side. Governor Willard Preble Hall appointed Crittenden to the post of Missouri Attorney General in 1864.

Following his term, Crittenden moved his law practice to Warrensburg, Missouri in partnership with Francis Cockrell. Crittenden was elected to the United States House of Representatives for the 7th Congressional District in 1872 and again in 1876. In 1880, he helped to found the Missouri Bar Association.

Crittenden was elected Governor of Missouri in the 1880 election.  As governor, Crittenden wanted to suppress the robberies and violence committed by the James Gang.  He authorized a reward of $5,000 (which was paid for by railroad corporations) for the capture of Jesse James and also for his brother Frank, which resulted in Robert Ford killing Jesse in 1882. Following Ford's conviction for the murder, Crittenden pardoned him. On October 5, 1882, Frank James surrendered in Jefferson City.

During his term, Crittenden's administration also collected payment on loans to the Hannibal and St. Joseph Railroad, reduced state debt, established the Missouri State Board of Health and the Missouri State Bureau of Mines and Mine inspection, increased appropriations for education, and started a training school for nurses in St. Louis.

Following his gubernatorial term, Crittenden moved to Kansas City, Missouri and practiced law. From 1893 to 1897, he was the United States consul general in Mexico City, appointed by President Grover Cleveland. Crittenden died in 1909 in Kansas City, Missouri.  He was buried there at the Forest Hill Calvary Cemetery in Kansas City.

Popular media
In the 2007 movie The Assassination of Jesse James by the Coward Robert Ford, Crittenden is portrayed by James Carville.

References

External links

1832 births
1909 deaths
19th-century American politicians
Centre College alumni
Crittenden family
Democratic Party members of the United States House of Representatives from Missouri
Democratic Party governors of Missouri
Missouri Attorneys General
People from Shelbyville, Kentucky